Gallate may refer to:

 gallic acid salt, a salt or ester of gallic acid
 gallium salt, a salt containing oxyanions of gallium

de:Gallate